Natasha Anne Ryan (born 1984) is an Australian woman from Rockhampton, Queensland who went missing on 31 August 1998 when aged 14. Police had wrongly assumed that her best friend Maioha Tokotaua, who was 15 years-old at the time of her disappearance, killed Ryan, but  local serial killer Leonard Fraser was later accused. 
In 2003 police received a letter saying that Natasha was alive and provided a phone number and address at where she could be reached. The police raided the location that was mentioned in the letter and Ryan was discovered alive in 2003 at her boyfriend’s house hiding in a wardrobe, almost five years after she went missing, during the trial of the man accused of her murder. It was discovered that 14 year old Ryan had left home willingly to be with her older boyfriend, Scott Black, a 22 year old milkman, and had been living and hiding in his home for years. In 2008, they married and reportedly the two have three children.

Background
Natasha Ryan disappeared in August 1998 after her mother dropped her off at school, and was subsequently reported as missing. Hopes of finding Ryan alive soon diminished and police concluded she had been murdered by Rockhampton serial killer Leonard Fraser, who was subsequently charged with Ryan's murder. An extensive and exhaustive search was undertaken for her and three other girls two years after her disappearance by police and local State Emergency Service volunteers as part of an investigation into a serial killer. 

In the month before she went missing, Ryan had already run away from home once, aided by Scott Black, her 22 year-old boyfriend. During that incident, she was found after two days. Black faced Rockhampton Magistrates Court in November 1999, where he pleaded guilty to wilful obstruction of police after he had told officers that he did not know Ryan's whereabouts. But after she could not be located when she went missing the second time, Ryan's family eventually conceded that she was dead. They held a memorial service in Bundaberg, Queensland on her 17th birthday in 2001.

Murder trial
On 11 April 2003, during Fraser's murder trial in Brisbane, police prosecutor Paul Rutledge informed the court that Fraser pleaded not guilty of the murder of Ryan. Ryan's father, Robert Ryan, said he almost collapsed when Rutledge made the announcement.

Police had raided a house in North Rockhampton on the night of 10 April 2003 after a tip-off and had found Ryan alive, hiding in a bedroom cupboard. It was discovered that Ryan had been living with Black since disappearing on 31 August 1998. It was reported that for most of that time, Ryan had shared a house in Yeppoon, Queensland, but had moved back to Rockhampton after Black received a transfer with his milk delivery job. Ryan had been living in the Rockhampton house for six months prior to being found.

Despite becoming known as "The Girl in the Cupboard" and the media leading people to believe that Ryan had spent most of her time in a cupboard, it was soon learned she only used a cupboard to hide if visitors called around to visit her boyfriend. The remainder of the time, Ryan freely walked around the house but always with the curtains drawn. It was also reported that she had ventured outside a number of times, but always under the cover of darkness, which included a midnight visit to the beach.

Despite the discovery that Ryan was still alive and the doubt it cast on the evidence which led to Fraser being charged with Ryan's murder, Fraser's defense counsel did not lodge an appeal for a mistrial, and the trial resumed. Ryan attended what had been her own murder trial on 30 April 2003 to answer questions. She told the court she had never met Fraser and did not know the witness who stated that she had been seen in the presence of Fraser before she went missing.

Prosecution
Soon after being discovered alive, it became apparent that Ryan and Black would likely face criminal charges for their role in the false investigation into her murder. In 2005, Rockhampton District Court judge, Grant Britton, sentenced Black to a three-year jail sentence for perjury, with two years suspended, after he pleaded guilty to telling investigating police officers that he did not know Ryan's whereabouts.

In 2006, Ryan was found guilty of causing a false police investigation and was fined $1,000. Police prosecutor Terry Gardiner produced the $120,000 contract Ryan had signed with PBL as evidence of Ryan having means to pay back at least some of the $151,000 police investigation into her murder. However, Magistrate Annette Hennessy ruled that Ryan did not have the means to pay the costs of the investigation. In the same court proceedings, Black was further punished by being convicted, fined $3,000 and ordered to pay $16,000 towards investigation costs.

Media
The story of Ryan being found alive during the murder trial attracted international attention.

Following her re-appearance, Australian publicist Max Markson signed Ryan up as a client, and negotiated potential deals with several media organisations. Markson eventually secured a media deal with Publishing and Broadcasting Limited, which was the parent company of ACP Magazines and the Nine Network. The deal guaranteed that Ryan would do exclusive interviews with ACP's Woman's Day and 60 Minutes.

60 Minutes sent reporter Tara Brown to Rockhampton to interview Ryan. Assuming Ryan's story was going to hand them a ratings-winning program, 60 Minutes held the broadcast until 20 April 2003 in an attempt to take viewers away from Network Ten's premiere of the third season of their ratings winner, Big Brother Australia. The strategy failed to work and Big Brother Australia won the battle with an average capital city audience of 2.2 million viewers, compared to the 1.7 million viewers 60 Minutes managed to attract.

There were reports that the deal Markson negotiated would bring in more than $200,000 for Ryan, prompting a discussion about the ethics of Ryan accepting the money when so much time, effort and money was spent on the search for her, and the police investigation. Rockhampton State Emergency Service volunteer Lyle Dobbs expressed his view that any profit Ryan gained from her interviews should go back to Queensland taxpayers who funded the search which came at significant cost to police and a lot of effort from SES volunteers. The contract was eventually produced in court proceedings in 2006, which confirmed that Ryan had been paid $120,000 for the interviews.

Ryan and Black married in 2008. It is believed that prior to their wedding, they signed another media deal with Woman's Day for exclusivity to the stories that were published before and after their wedding. During the wedding at Byfield, Queensland, there was strict security, with guests screened and strictly forbidden from taking any photos during the ceremony and reception. It was reported the wedding story deal with Woman's Day was worth $200,000.

See also
List of solved missing person cases

References

External links
 
 

1984 births
Crime in Queensland
Date of birth missing (living people)
Formerly missing people
Living people
Missing person cases in Australia
Place of birth missing (living people)